Leonardo Ledgister (born 27 April 1999) is a Jamaican athlete who competes in the 400m Hurdles.

Personal life
From Santa Cruz, Jamaica he attended St. Elizabeth Technical High School. He went to Southern University-New Orleans and then to Texas A&M-Corpus Christi.

Career
Ledgister was a finalist at the 2018 World Under-20 Championships in the 400m hurdles finishing fourth in Tampere, Finland in a personal best time of 49.93.

On 30 May 2021 he achieved the 400m hurdles Olympic qualifying standard for the delayed 2020 Tokyo Olympics after he ran a personal best 48.79 seconds to place second at the National Collegiate Athletics Association (NCAA) West Regionals at his home track of Texas A&M University in College Station, Texas. In June, 2021 he advanced to the finals of the 400m hurdles at the 2021 NCAA Outdoor Championships at Hayward Field, Eugene, Oregon, finishing sixth overall. He earned All-America First-Team honors, becoming the first Jamaican to do so since Hickel Woolery in 2009 in the discus.

Ledgister had a disappointing run at the Jamaican Olympic trials where he was the fastest man in the field but did not get past the semi-finals, finishing eighth in his race. Ledgister was subsequently named as a reserve in the Jamaican squad for the Tokyo Olympics, however was unable to compete at the event.

References

1999 births
Living people
Jamaican male hurdlers
Texas A&M–Corpus Christi Islanders men's track and field athletes
People from Saint Elizabeth Parish
Southern University at New Orleans alumni